Luca Volontè (born 17 March 1966) is an Italian politician, born in Saronno (Lombardy). He has graduated in political science from the University of Milan. He is a member of the Union of the Centre.

Political career 
In 1994, Luca Volontè became in charge of the local entities in the Italian Popular Party (PPI). He followed Rocco Buttiglione in the split from the PPI, which lead to the foundation of the CDU, where he became an organizational manager.

Luca Volontè was elected as a Member to the Chamber of Deputies from the second constituency of Lombardy during the elections of 1996. He was re-elected in 2001, 2006 and 2008.

From 2010 to 2013 he served as chairman of the parliamentary group of the European People's Party in the Parliamentary Assembly of the Council of Europe.

Corruption charges and conviction 
Following investigative reports, published by the European Stability Initiative on "Caviar diplomacy", in June 2016, the Milan prosecutor's office brought charges against Luca Volontè on 2 episodes: money laundering and accepting bribes. In 2017, it was also revealed that Volontè had been involved in the Azerbaijani laundromat scandal - a complex money-laundering scheme used to pay off European politicians in an attempt to whitewash Azerbaijan’s reputation abroad. According to the Prosecutor's Office Volontè received €2.39 million to organise support for Azerbaijani officials in the Council of Europe. 

In January 2021, Criminal Section X of the Court of Milan sentenced Luca Volontè to four years in prison for taking bribes from Azerbaijani politicians.

References 

1966 births
Living people
Deputies of Legislature XIII of Italy
Deputies of Legislature XIV of Italy
Deputies of Legislature XV of Italy
Deputies of Legislature XVI of Italy
20th-century Italian politicians
21st-century Italian politicians
 Prisoners and detainees of Italy